Joint Action Committee for Political Affairs (JACPAC) is a national political action committee that contributes to candidates for the US Congress who support a strong US-Israel relationship, reproductive choice, and separation of religion and state.  Describing itself as the pro-Israel PAC with a domestic conscience,  JACPAC has made it a point to show Congress that the Jewish community is more than a single-issue community; its priorities include but are not limited to the US-Israel Relationship.

JACPAC funds its support for Congressional campaigns through annual memberships and through bundling of member donations to candidates.  All donations are hand-delivered by JACPAC members.  Although JACPAC describes itself as bipartisan, the majority of its support goes to Democrats.

Mission
With so many Jewish organizations advancing the goal of US support for Israel, JACPAC was the first and for many years the only bipartisan PAC to blend the commitment to Israel with a commitment to a progressive domestic agenda.  JACPAC favors US involvement in the peace process but takes no position on internal Israeli politics or policies.  JACPAC views itself as a moderate-progressive political voice for the Jewish community on Capitol Hill and a political resource to make its members better informed and more politically engaged. According to its literature, JACPAC blends Judaism’s call to action and America’s fundamental grassroots political involvement.

History
JACPAC was founded in 1981 by a group of volunteer leaders in the national Jewish community who sought to empower Jewish women to become politically active.  The founding women were convinced the time was right to use fundraising skills and political know-how to support the US-Israel relationship and to respond to the increasing power of the organized political right, then known as the religious right or the radical right. Organizations such as the Moral Majority and The Christian Coalition, to name two, were instrumental in defeating Congressional allies of Israel in the 1980 election.  These organizations opposed foreign aid to Israel—and foreign aid in general. They favored prayer in schools and religious symbols in the public arena. They became adept at using the media to bring about the victory of their candidates.

JACPAC women reached out to their networks across the country. Their message was this: the way to support Israel and be a positive alternative to the organized political right is to be engaged in the political process.

Before long, support for Israel began to be taken up by organizations on the political right that saw the power of the pro-Israel movement in America and its compatibility with their theology. While these groups rejected the social values held by most American Jews, their allegiance to Israel was enough to attract some Jewish admirers.  JACPAC, however, refused to support candidates aligned with or supported by the organized political right no matter how pro-Israel they claimed to be.

JACPAC sought to channel Jewish financial support to candidates with a more comprehensive agenda, according to Rabbi David Saperstein, Director and counsel of the Religious Action Center for Reform Judaism (RAC).  "[JACPAC's] genius was to encourage thousands of women to get involved in local politics as Jews, organize visibly as Jews and assert Jewish values and interests," Saperstein added.

Other forces went into the making of JACPAC as well, according to noted political consultant Ann Lewis. "Feminism was in the air.  Women worked together through formal and informal networks.  They were visible as candidates, advocates and activists.  JACPAC was the right organization at the right time," Lewis said.

In 1989, recognizing that opposition to abortion was moving to the top of the right wing political  agenda and abortion rights were being eroded, JACPAC incorporated reproductive choice into its mission. That was the year the US Supreme Court ruled in Webster v. Reproductive Health Services that states could legislate certain limits on abortion rights.  At the same time, religious groups that opposed abortion began to include opposition to family planning and stem cell research in their agenda.  JACPAC reaffirmed is commitment to the separation of religion and state.

At its inception, JACPAC was a women's organization.  Along the way, men were encouraged to join.

Aims and activities
Through its nationwide membership, JACPAC raises campaign contributions to support Democratic and Republican US Senate and House candidates who support its agenda.  JACPAC first requires the candidates it supports to be pro-Israel and then looks at their stance on domestic issues. JACPAC support often goes to candidates with few Jewish constituents in the belief that their votes count just as much as the votes from heavily Jewish constituencies.  According to the Chicago Tribune, JACPAC prides itself on identifying challengers who have potential for success.   Charlie Cook, of the Cook Political Report has stated that JACPAC is "more knowledgeable about their races than 95 percent of the PACs out there."

JACPAC raised nearly half a million dollars for federal candidates through both direct and conduit contributions in the 2008 elections. Ten new House members and six new Senators were recipients of JACPAC support in 2008.

Advocacy
Joint Action Committee (JAC) is an advocacy group that promotes the United States-Israel relationship, separation of religion and state, reproductive freedom and selected initiatives consistent with Jewish community values. One such initiative is to gather support for US ratification of the UN Convention on the Elimination of All Forms of Discrimination against Women (CEDAW). To promote its agenda, Joint Action Committee enlists Jewish community participation in advocacy with elected officials. Joint Action Committee (JAC) is organized as a non-profit charitable organization under IRS code 501c4.

JAC holds an annual conference in Washington, DC each spring.  The meeting consists of issue briefings followed by advocacy with members of Congress on current issues of concern to the Jewish community.  JAC assembles small groups that each meet with about ten members of Congress from diverse districts and states.  Some 100 appointments are scheduled.

External links
www.jacpac.org
JACBlog!
Facebook Page

References

Jewish-American political organizations
Women's political advocacy groups in the United States
Israel–United States relations
Separation of church and state in the United States
Organizations established in 1981